In mathematics, a de Branges space (sometimes written De Branges space) is a concept in functional analysis and is constructed from a de Branges function.

The concept is named after Louis de Branges who proved numerous results regarding these spaces, especially as Hilbert spaces, and used those results to prove the Bieberbach conjecture.

De  Branges functions

Definition 1
Given a Hermite-Biehler function , the de Branges space  is defined as the set of all entire functions F such that

where:
  is the open upper half of the complex plane.
 .
  is the usual Hardy space on the open upper half plane.

Definition 2
A de Branges space can also be defined as all entire functions  satisfying all of the following conditions:

Definition 3
There exists also an axiomatic description, useful in operator theory.

As Hilbert spaces
Given a de Branges space . Define the scalar product:

A de Branges space with such a scalar product can be proven to be a Hilbert space.

References

 

Operator theory
Hardy spaces